Kuralt is surname of several people:
 Anže Kuralt (born 1991), a Slovenian ice hockey player
 Charles Kuralt (1934–1997), an American journalist
 Jože Kuralt (1956–1986), a Slovene alpine skier
 Wallace Hamilton Kuralt (1908–1994), an American government bureaucrat from North Carolina